Eustegia is a genus of vines in the family Apocynaceae, first described as a genus with this name in 1810. It is native to southern Africa.

Species, accepted, all endemic to South Africa
 Eustegia filiformis (L.f.) Schult.
 Eustegia fraterna N.E.Br.
 Eustegia hastata (Thunb.) R. Br. ex Schult.  
 Eustegia macropetala Schltr. 
 Eustegia minuta (L.f.) N.E.Br. 
 Eustegia plicata Schinz

References

Asclepiadoideae
Apocynaceae genera
Endemic flora of South Africa